"Donkey" is a song recorded by American country music artist Jerrod Niemann. It was released in May 2014 as the second single from his album High Noon. The song was written by David Tolliver, Kyle Jacobs, and Fred Wilhelm. "Donkey" was a critical and commercial failure, garnering mostly negative reviews and peaking at only number 43 on the Country Airplay chart. As a result, it was pulled from country radio in June 2014.

Critical reception
The song has received mostly negative reviews from critics. Derek Hudgin of Country Perspective gave it a very negative review, calling it "The Worst Country Song of the Year", and heavily criticizing its lyrics as well as the use of autotune. Liv Carter of Little Rebellion gave the song two thumbs down, similarly criticizing the lyrics and writing "That three writers had, let’s be charitable, a momentary lapse in judgement is one thing, but for Niemann to record this and preserve it forever is quite another. I can forgive quite a lot in lyrics, and I have no problem with silly, catchy, meaning-free songs that are just meant to make people feel good. But can we please get some songs that manage to do all that without degrading women? There is nothing wrong with writing a stupid song about an “ass.” But there is a lot wrong with acting like one."

Website Taste of Country gave the song a more positive review, saying that "it’s more down-home than the auto-tune-heavy ‘Drink to That All Night.’ This is the song that could get you up and dancing at any of the best country bars — and Niemann knows it."

Chart performance
"Donkey" failed to match the chart success of Niemann's previous single "Drink to That All Night", peaking at numbers 43 and 38 on the Country Airplay and Hot Country Songs charts, respectively.

References

2014 songs
2014 singles
Jerrod Niemann songs
Arista Nashville singles
Songs written by Kyle Jacobs (songwriter)